Masterpiece is the fourth album by golden age hardcore MC Just-Ice, it was released in 1990.  Masterpiece was Just-Ice's final album on the Fresh/Sleeping Bag Records label, and it was produced by Grandmaster Flash.

Track listing
 "Get Into Something" (Grandmaster Flash, Just-Ice) – 3:40
 "The Ice Man Commeth" (Grandmaster Flash, Just-Ice) – 3:33
 "Flavor" (Grandmaster Flash, Just-Ice) – 5:02
 "The Music" (Grandmaster Flash, Just-Ice) – 4:27
 "Slow, Low And Dope" (Grandmaster Flash, Just-Ice) – 3:41
 "Keep To Myself" (Grandmaster Flash, Just-Ice) – 4:13
 "Rollin' With The Just" (Grandmaster Flash, Just-Ice) – 3:30
 "Round-N-Round" (Grandmaster Flash, Just-Ice) – 5:09
 "Tell It Like It Is" (Grandmaster Flash, Just-Ice) – 5:08
 "I Write This In The Dark" (Grandmaster Flash, Just-Ice) – 4:47

Charts

References

External links
 [ Masterpiece] at Allmusic
 Masterpiece at Discogs.com

1990 albums
Just-Ice albums
Fresh Records (US) albums
Albums produced by Grandmaster Flash